Alaeddine Bouslimi (born 5 September 1990) is a Tunisian professional footballer who plays as a centre back for Al-Washm in Saudi Arabia.

Club career

Kelantan
On 20 May 2018, Bouslimi signed a contract with Malaysia Super League side Kelantan.

Saudi Arabia
On 9 August 2021, Bouslimi joined Saudi club Jeddah.

On 18 August 2021, Bouslimi joined Saudi Second Division club Al-Washm.

References

External links 
 
 

Living people
1986 births
Tunisian footballers
Tunisian expatriate footballers
Association football defenders
EGS Gafsa players
ES Zarzis players
Club Africain players
Stade Tunisien players
CS Hammam-Lif players
Kelantan FA players
AS Gabès players
Al-Ahli Club (Manama) players
ES Métlaoui players
Jeddah Club players
Al-Washm Club players
Tunisian Ligue Professionnelle 1 players
Malaysia Super League players
Bahraini Premier League players
Saudi First Division League players
Saudi Second Division players
Expatriate footballers in Malaysia
Tunisian expatriate sportspeople in Malaysia
Expatriate footballers in Bahrain
Expatriate footballers in Saudi Arabia
Tunisian expatriate sportspeople in Saudi Arabia